Václav J. Havel is a Czech mathematician. He is known for characterizing the degree sequences of undirected graphs and the Havel–Hakimi algorithm. It is an important contribution to the theory graphs.

Selected publications

References

Possibly living people
Czech mathematicians
Graph theorists